Five Golden Hours is a 1961 Italian-British comedy film directed by Mario Zampi and written by Hans Wilhelm, starring Ernie Kovacs, Cyd Charisse and George Sanders, and featuring Dennis Price and John Le Mesurier.

Plot
Aldo Bondi (Kovacs) is a professional pallbearer and mourner in Rome who lives well off the extravagant gifts given to him by the rich widows he comforts.  When he falls for the supposedly penniless Baroness Sandra (Charisse) – who is actually a rich "black widow" whose husbands all die – he concocts a Ponzi scheme to bilk three widows by taking money from them, telling them that he will invest it during the "five golden hours" between the closing of the stock exchange in Rome, and the opening of the New York Stock Exchange. However, the Baroness absconds with the cash, leaving Bondi in hock to the widows.  He attempts to kill them, but the scheme fails and he pretends to have gone insane.  In the sanatarium, his roommate is another debtor feigning madness, Mr. Bing (Sanders).

One of the three widows dies, leaving Bondi a fortune, which he can only have if he continues to be insane, otherwise the inheritance is to go to a monastery – so Bondi makes a deal with the brothers to split the money.  He returns to Rome, where Mr. Bing makes contact with Baroness Sandra and, for a fee, tells her that Bondi is now rich.  Sandra and Bondi get married, and soon he is her seventh dead husband.

Cast

 Ernie Kovacs as Aldo Bondi
 Cyd Charisse as Baroness Sandra
 George Sanders as Mr. Bing
 Kay Hammond as Martha
 Dennis Price as Raphael
 Clelia Matania as Rosalia
 John Le Mesurier as Doctor Alfieri
 Finlay Currie as Father Superior
 Reginald Beckwith as Brother Geronimo
 Avice Landone as Beatrice
 Sydney Tafler as Alfredo
 Martin Benson as Enrico
 Bruno Barnabe as Cesare
 Ron Moody as Gabrielle
 Leonard Sachs as Mr. Morini

Production
Five Golden Hours was filmed in two versions, one for English-language release, and another, released as Cinque ore in contanti, for Italian consumption.  In the Italian version, some of the smaller roles were taken by Italian actors.  Location shooting for the film took place in Bolzano, Italy and the surrounding area.

Kovacs cited the picture as his favorite among his own films.

The film was the last directed by Mario Zampi.

Reception
The movie received generally tepid reviews. The one in Variety complained that "too much onus is flung on the shoulders of Ernie Kovacs, a talented comedian, but one who is more acceptable in smaller doses." The New York Times Howard Thompson added that "Alec Guinness and a subtle director could have turned (the film) into gold," but "hammered brass is what we get, unfortunately." He was critical of the two American stars, saying that Kovacs was "sniggering self-consciousness" while Charisse was "merely wooden." The Sunday Times presented a more favorable evaluation, calling it "a wicked, happy little surprise," "an excellent black joke of a sort rare in the British cinema" and  that "most importantly, it has Ernie Kovacs, a player whose comic vitality hasn't been staled."

Novelization
In anticipation of the film's release, Digit Books of London (the paperback imprint of Brown, Watson Limited) published a novelization of the screenplay. While the cover and title page say "Adapted from the screenplay by Hans Wilhelm," the novelist is not credited.

ReferencesNotes'

External links

1961 films
Italian comedy films
English-language Italian films
1961 comedy films
British black-and-white films
Films about con artists
Films set in Italy
Columbia Pictures films
British multilingual films
1960s multilingual films
Films shot at MGM-British Studios
1960s English-language films
1960s Italian films
English-language comedy films